Gugava is a Georgian surname. Notable people with the surname include:

Georgi Gugava (born 1978), Georgian judoka
Lexo Gugava (born 1982), Georgian rugby union player

Georgian-language surnames